Salinifilum ghardaiense is an extremely halophilic bacterium from the genus Salinifilum which has been isolated from sahara soil from Chaâbet Ntissa, M'zab, Ghardaïa Province, Algeria.

References

 

Pseudonocardiales
Bacteria described in 2014